Infantile neuronal ceroid lipofuscinoses (INCL) or Santavuori disease or Hagberg-Santavuori disease or Santavuori-Haltia disease or Infantile Finnish type neuronal ceroid lipofuscinosis or Balkan disease is a form of NCL and inherited as a recessive autosomal genetic trait. The disorder is progressive, degenerative and fatal, extremely rare worldwide – with approximately 60 official cases reported by 1982, perhaps 100 with the condition in total today – but relatively common in Finland due to the local founder effect.

Presentation
The development of children born with INCL is normal for the first 8–18 months, but will then flounder and start to regress both physically and mentally. Motor skills and speech are lost, and optic atrophy causes blindness. A variety of neurological symptoms, such as epilepsy and myoclonic seizures, appear. The senses of hearing and touch remain unaffected. The average lifespan of an INCL child is 9–11 years.

Causes
It has been associated with palmitoyl-protein thioesterase.

Diagnosis

Treatment
Treatment is limited. Drugs can alleviate the symptoms, such as sleep difficulties and epilepsy. Physiotherapy helps affected children retain the ability to remain upright for as long as possible, and prevents some of the pain.

Recent attempts to treat INCL with cystagon have been unsuccessful.

See also 
 FAIDD (The Finnish Association on Intellectual and Developmental Disabilities)

References

External links 

  GeneReviews/NCBI/NIH/UW entry on Neuronal Ceroid-Lipofuscinosis
 An overview (in Finnish)
 The INCL organization of Finland (in Finnish)

Lipid storage disorders